Snooker world rankings 2017/2018: The professional world rankings for all the professional snooker players, who qualified for the 2017–18 season, are listed below. The rankings work as a two-year rolling list. The points for each tournament two years ago are removed when the corresponding tournament during the current season finishes. The following table contains the rankings which were used to determine the seedings for certain tournaments. Note that the list given below are just those rankings that are used for seeding tournaments. Other rankings are produced after each ranking event which are not noted here.

Sources: World Rankings and Full Calendar (worldsnooker.com)

Notes

References

2017
Rankings 2017
Rankings 2018